Armourdale may refer to:

Armourdale, Kansas
Armourdale (electoral district)